Catch the Breeze is a two-disc collection of songs by English shoegazing band Slowdive. It was released in November 2004 on Sanctuary Midline with sleeve notes by Paul Lester.

Track listing
Disc 1:
 "Slowdive" – 5:15
 "Avalyn I" – 4:51
 "Morningrise" – 4:19
 "Catch the Breeze" – 4:17
 "Golden Hair" – 4:02
 "Shine" – 5:20
 "Albatross" – 5:14
 "Golden Hair" (Live BBC Peel Session) – 3:41
 "Spanish Air" – 5:58
 "So Tired" – 4:03
 "Alison" – 3:48
 "Country Rain" – 3:33
 "Machine Gun" – 4:21
 "When the Sun Hits" – 4:45

Disc 2:
 "40 Days" – 3:15
 "Souvlaki Space Station" – 5:58
 "Dagger" – 3:30
 "Here She Comes" – 2:16
 "Melon Yellow" – 3:51
 "Sing" – 4:49
 "Blue Skied an' Clear" – 6:52
 "Crazy for You" – 5:59
 "J's Heaven" – 6:46
 "Visions of LA" – 1:45
 "Rutti" – 10:03

References 

Slowdive albums
2004 compilation albums
Sanctuary Records compilation albums